Innes' star  (Gliese 422) is an M3.5-type red dwarf, located in constellation Carina. It has around 35% of the mass of the Sun, yet only 1.1% of its luminosity, and an estimated surface temperature of 3,323 K.

Discovery
Innes' star was discovered in 1920 by Robert T. A. Innes in Union Observatory, Union of South Africa, who had discerned its large proper motion and a parallax of 0.337 arcsec. The discovery was published in Circular of the Union Observatory No. 49, hence its discovery name is UO 49, or In UOC 49. However, UO designations should be used with caution since they are often not unique for each star: the number in the name is the number of Circular, so all stars published in one Circular have identical names. So, all other newfound stars, published in the 49th Circular, may be named UO 49 too.

Erroneous parallax
It is known for the fact that it had once been considered one of the nearest stars to Earth, due to erroneously measured parallax. The estimated distance was less than 10 light-years in the following studies:

In List of stars nearer than 5 parsecs by Ejnar Hertzsprung (1922) its parallax is 0.339 arcsec (distance is 2.95 pc or 9.62 ly), and it is the 4th-closest star system after Alpha Centauri ABC, Barnard's Star and Sirius AB;
In A study of the near-by stars by Willem Jacob Luyten and Harlow Shapley (1930) its parallax is 0.337 arcsec (distance is 2.97 pc or 9.68 ly), and it is the 4th-closest star system after Alpha Centauri ABC, Barnard's Star and 22 H Camelopardalis (Sirius is further);
In List of stars nearer than five parsecs by Peter van de Kamp (1930) its parallax is 0.34 arcsec (distance is 2.94 pc or 9.59 ly), and it is the 7th-closest star system after Alpha Centauri ABC, Barnard's Star, Wolf 359, Lalande 21185, Sirius AB and BD-12 4523;
In Stars within ten parsecs of the Sun by Louise Freeland Jenkins (1937) its parallax is 0.34 arcsec (distance is 2.94 pc or 9.59 ly), and it is the 6th-closest star system after Alpha Centauri, Barnard's Star, Wolf 359, Lalande 21185 and Sirius.

Its actual distance is 12.667 parsecs, or 41.32 light-years, based on parallax by van Leeuwen (2007) and Gaia DR2:  arcsec.

Planetary system
In 2014, a Mega-Earth or a mini-Neptune, GJ 422 b, of approximately ten Earth-masses, was discovered in the system of this star, orbiting the star every 20 days and lying at a distance of around 0.11 astronomical units (AU)—11% of the distance between the Earth and Sun—on the inner edge of the stellar system's habitable zone, which for this star has been calculated to lie between 0.11 and 0.21 AU.

The discovery of GJ 422 b was confirmed in 2020.

Name
Innes' Star is one of a few stars named after people—named after a scientist, whereas the majority of proper names of stars have ancient origins or medieval, in the main Arabic, ones. Certain stars, found to be nearby due to their large proper motion, also fall into this class and are named after their discoverers: Barnard's Star, Kapteyn's Star, Luyten's Star, van Maanen's Star, van Biesbroeck's Star, and Teegarden's Star. Innes is also known as the discoverer of Proxima Centauri.

References

External links
Planet GJ 422 b

M-type main-sequence stars
Stars with proper names
304043
0422
055042
Carina (constellation)
?